Many places which were once in the former British Empire were named after the British monarch who reigned over it for the greater part of its most dominant period, Queen Victoria. As such, Victoria is one of the most commemorated individuals in place-names around the world.

Other places that have the name "Victoria", without the association with Queen Victoria, tend to be derived from the Spanish language-word for 'victory', see Victoria (disambiguation).

Commonwealth

Australia

Australian Capital Territory
Queen Victoria Terrace, Canberra

New South Wales
Queens Park, the urban park
, the Sydney suburb located adjacent to the urban park
Queen's Square, Sydney
Statue of Queen Victoria by Joseph Boehm
Queen Victoria Building, Sydney
Statue of Queen Victoria, Sydney
Queen Victoria Street, Bexley
Queen Victoria Street, Drummoyne
Victoria Street, Ashfield
One Victoria (1-7 Victoria St)
Victoria Bridge (Penrith)
Victoria Bridge, Picton
Victoria Road, Sydney

Queensland
State of Queensland
Queen Street, Brisbane

South Australia
Great Victoria Desert (also in Western Australia)
Lake Alexandrina
Victoria Square, Adelaide
Victoria Park, Adelaide

Tasmania
Queen Victoria Museum and Art Gallery, Launceston
Victoria Bridge, Devonport
Victoria Dock, Hobart

Victoria
State of Victoria
Queen's College (University of Melbourne)
Queens Park, 
Queens Park, Moonee Ponds
Queens Park, 
Queen Victoria Gardens, Melbourne
Queen Victoria Hospital, Melbourne 
Queen Victoria Market, Melbourne
Queen Victoria Street, Newington
Victoria Dock, Melbourne
Victoria Street, Melbourne
Victoria Street,

Western Australia
Great Victoria Desert (also in South Australia)
Queen Victoria Street, Fremantle, Western Australia
Queen Victoria Street, Leonora, Western Australia
Victoria Park, Perth, Western Australia

The Bahamas
Queen's Staircase, Nassau, The Bahamas

Bangladesh
Comilla Victoria College, Comilla (now Comilla Victoria Government College)
Victoria Public Library, Natore 
Victoria Road, Tangail
Narail Government Victoria College, Narail

Barbados
Queen Victoria Road, Bridgetown

Belize
Victoria Peak

Canada

During the process of Confederation, "Victorialand" and "Victorialia" were among the alternative suggestions to Canada as to what the name of the new Dominion should be.

Alberta
Fort Victoria, Alberta
Victoria Lake, Alberta
 Victoria Park, Edmonton, Alberta
 Victoria Park neighbourhood, Calgary, Alberta
 Victoria Peak, Alberta

British Columbia
 Victoria, British Columbia
 Victoria Avenue, Victoria, British Columbia
 Empress Hotel, Victoria, British Columbia
 Victoria Drive, Vancouver, British Columbia
 Queen Victoria Hospital, Revelstoke, British Columbia

Ontario
 Queen Street, Toronto, Ontario
 Victoria Street, Toronto
 Victoria Park Avenue, Toronto
 Queen Victoria Park, Niagara Falls, Ontario
 Victoria Street (N and S), Kitchener, Ontario
 Victoria Street, London, Ontario
 Victoria Avenue, Windsor, Ontario
Victoria College, U of Toronto
Queen Victoria PS, Toronto
Queen streets and Victoria streets in almost every city or town
Royal Victoria Regional Health Centre, Barrie
Victoria Gardens Long Term Care, Hamilton

Manitoba
 Victoria, Manitoba
 Victoria Beach, Manitoba
 Victoria Park, Souris, Manitoba
 Victoria Hospital, Winnipeg, Manitoba
 Victoria and Albert School, Winnipeg

New Brunswick
 Victoria County, New Brunswick
 Victoria Corner, New Brunswick
 Victoria Park, Moncton, New Brunswick

Newfoundland and Labrador
 Victoria, Newfoundland
 Victoria Park, St John's, Newfoundland and Labrador

Nova Scotia
 Victoria County, Cape Breton, Nova Scotia
 New Victoria, Cape Breton, Nova Scotia
 Victoria Park, Truro, Nova Scotia
 Victoria Beach, Nova Scotia
 The Victoria Theater, Halifax, Nova Scotia
 Victoria Building @ the QEII Health Sciences Centre, Halifax, Nova Scotia
 Victoria Park / Viktoria Road, Halifax, Nova Scotia
 Victoria Road, Dartmouth, Nova Scotia

Prince Edward Island
 Victoria-by-the-Sea, Prince Edward Island
 Victoria Park, Charlottetown, Prince Edward Island

Quebec
 Victoriaville, Quebec
 Royal Victoria Hospital, Montreal, Quebec
 Square Victoria, Montreal
 Victoria Bridge, Montreal
 Victoria Avenue, Montreal
 Victoria Park/Parc Victoria, Quebec City, Quebec

Saskatchewan
 Regina, Saskatchewan
 Victoria Park, Regina Saskatchewan
 Victoria Hospital, Prince Albert, Saskatchewan
 Victoria School, Kamsack, Saskatchewan
 Victoria Avenue, Saskatoon, Saskatchewan
Victoria Avenue, Regina

Territories
 Victoria Island, Nunavut and Northwest Territories
 Victoria and Albert Mountains, Ellesmere Island, Nunavut

Ghana
Victoriaborg, neighborhood of Accra

India
Victoria Dock, Mumbai; part of the Bombay Port Trust.
Victoria Hospital (Bangalore Medical College), Bangalore.
Victoria School, Kurseong, West Bengal.
Victoria Memorial, Kolkata
Victoria Terrace, Kolkata
Victoria Avenue, Hiranandani Meadows, Mumbai
Queensgate, Hiranandani Estate, Mumbai
Queensway, Hiranandani Estate, Mumbai
Victorian Mews, Hiranandani Gardens, Mumbai
Victoria Road, Bangalore
Victoria Public Hall, Chennai
Victoria Park, Bhavnagar
Victoria Memorial Indoor Hall, Etawah
Queen Victoria Girls Inter College, Agra
Victoria Town Hall, Coimbatore
Albert Victor Bridge, Madurai

Jamaica
 Victoria Avenue, Kingston
 The Victoria Jubilee Hospital, Kingston

Malaysia
Victoria Institution, an elite secondary school, Kuala Lumpur
Victoria International College, a private higher education institution, Kuala Lumpur
Victoria Bridge, Malaysia, one of the oldest single track railway bridge in the country located in Karai, Perak
Jubilee Clock Tower of Queen Victoria, King Edward Place, George Town, Penang
Victoria Pier, the jetty of Penang
Victoria, Labuan, the capital of the Malaysian Federal Territory of Labuan, an island off the north coast of Borneo
Victoria Park, a park in Ipoh, Perak
Victoria Club of Selangor and Kuala Lumpur, a private club in Kuala Lumpur
Victoria Fountain, a Nouveau-inspired fountain in Merdeka Square, Kuala Lumpur
Victoria Memorial Fountain, a landmark fountain in Melaka town square
Lebuh Victoria, a famous street in George Town, Penang
Victoria Green, the playing field of the Chinese Recreation Club which houses the Queen Victoria Memorial Statue, Penang
Queensbay, a development area of Penang which houses Queensbay Mall, one of Southeast Asia's largest shopping malls
Jalan Queen, a street famous for its many hawker's stalls in the Pasir Pinji area of Ipoh, Perak
Victoria Hotel, a landmark of the island of Labuan, Borneo
Ladang Victoria, a rubber plantation area in Padang Serai, Kedah
Victoria Pahang Estate, an estate area in the state of Pahang
Jalan Victoria, a road in Nibong Tebal, mainland Penang
Lorong Victoria, a road in Tawau, Sabah
Puncak Victoria, a peak on Mount Kinabalu, Sabah

Malta
Victoria, capital of the island of Gozo, also known by its original name Rabat
Victoria Gate, a city gate in Valletta
Victoria Lines, a line of fortifications in northern Malta

Mauritius
Queen Victoria, Mauritius, a village in the district of Flacq, Mauritius

New Zealand
Victoria River, Northland
Victoria Park, Auckland
Mount Victoria, Auckland
Victoria Street, Auckland
Queen Street, Auckland
Victoria Street, Hamilton
Victoria Bridge, Hamilton
Victoria Bridge, Cambridge
Victoria Park, Feilding
Victoria Esplanade, Palmerston North
Victoria Avenue, Palmerston North
Mount Victoria (Manawatu-Wanganui)
Victoria Park, Foxton
Victoria University of Wellington, Wellington
Mount Victoria, Wellington
Mount Victoria (Marlborough)
Mount Victoria (Tasman)
Victoria Square, Christchurch
Victoria Street (Christchurch)
Victoria Park, Christchurch
Victoria Range, Tasman-West Coast
Victoria Glacier, West Coast
Queens Gardens, Dunedin
Queenstown
Victoria Bridge, Otago
Victoria Hill, Otago
Victoria Channel, Otago Harbour
Lake Victoria, Southland

Ross Dependency
Victoria Land, Ross Dependency

Nigeria
Victoria Island, Lagos
Victoria Garden City, Lagos
Victoria Cemetery, Lagos

Pakistan
 Empress Market, Karachi
 Bahawal-Victoria Hospital Bahawalpur
 Victoria Tower Jacobabad
 Haranpur (Victoria ) Bridge
 Victoria Memorial Hall, Sibi, Balochistan

Papua New Guinea
 Mount Victoria

Seychelles
Victoria

Singapore
Empress Place, Singapore
Empress Place Building, Singapore
Queen Street
Queen's Avenue
Queen's Close
Queen's Crescent
Queen's Road
Queensway, Singapore
Victoria Junior College also known as VJC or Victoria JC, an elite university preparatory institution
Victoria Lane
Victoria Park Close
Victoria Street
Victoria School
Victoria Theatre and Concert Hall

South Africa
Victoria Street, Durban
Victoria Embankment, Durban
Victoria & Alfred Waterfront, Cape Town
Victoria Street, Somerset West, Western Cape
 Victoria Shopping Mall, Caledon, Western Cape
 Victoria Main Road, Cape Town

Sri Lanka
Victoria Dam
Victoria Park, Nuwara Eliya

Tanzania
Lake Victoria

Trinidad and Tobago
Victoria Avenue, Port-of-Spain
Victoria County, Trinidad and Tobago
Victoria Street, San Fernando
Victoria Square, Port-of-Spain
Queen's Park Oval
Queen's Park Savannah

Uganda
Lake Victoria
Victoria Nile
Victoria University

United Kingdom
Note: this is only a small sample of the hundreds of locations in the United Kingdom with the name 'Victoria'.

England
Queen Victoria Square, Hull
Queen Hotel, Chester
Queen Victoria Road, Newcastle-upon-Tyne
Queen Victoria Street, London
Queen Victoria Street, Reading
 Queensmere, Wimbledon Common
Royal Victoria Dock, London
Royal Victoria Infirmary, Newcastle-upon-Tyne
Victoria and Albert Museum, London
Victoria Avenue, Wellington, Shropshire
Victoria Bridge, Datchet
Victoria Bridge, Hereford
Victoria Embankment, London
Victoria Gardens and Victoria Square, Truro, Cornwall
Victoria Gate, Hyde Park
Victoria Gate, Kew Gardens
Victoria Hall, Kidsgrove, Staffordshire
Victoria Park, Bournemouth
Victoria Park, East London
Victoria Park, Stretford
Victoria Place, Richmond upon Thames
 Victoria Quadrant, Weston-super-Mare
Victoria Quays, Sheffield
Victoria Road, Brighton
Victoria Road, Cambridge
Victoria Road, Canterbury
Victoria Road, Chelmsford, Essex
Victoria Road, Dagenham, Essex
Victoria Road, Diss, Norfolk
Victoria Road, Halton, Cheshire
Victoria Road and Victoria Grove, Kensington, London
Victoria Road, Kilburn, London
Victoria Road, London
Victoria Road, Lowestoft, Suffolk
Victoria Road, Oxford
Victoria Road, Plymouth
Victoria Road, South Ruislip, London
Victoria Road, Stretford, Manchester
Victoria Road, Swindon, Wiltshire
Victoria Road, Tunbridge Wells, Kent
Victoria Square, Birmingham, West Midlands
Victoria Station, Manchester
Victoria Street, Birmingham
Victoria Street, London
Victoria Tower, part of the Palace of Westminster
Victoria Terrace, Leeds

Northern Ireland
Queen Victoria Street, Belfast, Northern Ireland
Great Victoria Street, Belfast, Northern Ireland
Queen's University, Belfast
Great Victoria Street railway station, Belfast
Royal Victoria Hospital, Belfast
Victoria College, Belfast
Victoria Park, Belfast
Victoria Square, Belfast

Scotland
Glasgow Victoria Infirmary
Victoria Park, Aberdeen
Victoria Park, Dingwall
Victoria Park, Glasgow
Victoria Park Drive (North/South), Glasgow
Victoria Road, Aberdeen
Victoria Road, Ballater
Victoria Road, Brora
Victoria Road, Dundee
Queen Street, Dundee
Victoria Road, Dunoon
Victoria Road, Fort William
Victoria Road, Glasgow
Victoria Road, Gourock
Victoria Road, Helensburgh
Victoria Road, Kirkcaldy
Victoria Road, Leven, Fife
Victoria Road, Lockerbie
Victoria Road, North Berwick
Victoria Road, Peterhead
Victoria Road, Rutherglen
Victoria Street, Dunfermline
Victoria Street, Edinburgh
Victoria Street, Fraserburgh
Victoria Street, Galashiels
Victoria Street, Kirkwall
Victoria Street, Lanark
Victoria Street, Newton Stewart
Victoria Street, Perth
Victoria Street, Rutherglen
Victoria Tower, Greenock

Wales
Victoria, Newport

Crown Dependencies

Isle of Man
Victoria Pier, Douglas
Victoria Road, Douglas
Victoria Road, Onchan
Victoria Road, Castletown
Victoria Road School, Castletown
Victoria Street, Douglas

Jersey
Victoria Avenue (Jersey)
Victoria Road (Jersey)
Victoria Street (Jersey)
Victoria Park (Jersey)
Victoria College, Jersey Victoria College, St Helier, Jersey

Zambia
Victoria Falls (David Livingstone named the great Mosi-oa-Tunya falls after Queen Victoria)

Outside the Commonwealth
Burma, Hong Kong, Ireland and Zimbabwe were within the British Empire at the time many of the listed places were named. Hong Kong and Zimbabwe stopped being members of the Commonwealth of Nations in 1997 and 2003, respectively.

Burma/Myanmar
Mount Victoria (Nat Ma Taung)

Chile
Ascensor Reina Victoria, Valparaiso
Hotel Reina Victoria, Valparaiso

France
 Avenue de la Reine Victoria, Biarritz
 Avenue Reine Victoria, Nice
 Excelsior Régina Palace, Nice
 Avenue Victoria, Paris

Germany
Viktoriastraße, Hanover
Victoriastadt, Berlin

Greece
Victoria Square in Athens
Victoria metro station on the Athens Metro, situated under the aforementioned square

Hong Kong
Hong Kong was a British colony from 1841 until 1997.

Jubilee Street
Queen's Pier
Queen's Road
Queensway
Queen Victoria Street
Queen Street
Statue Square
City of Victoria
Victoria Gap
Victoria Harbour
Victoria Park
Victoria Park Road
Victoria Peak
Victoria Prison
Victoria Road
Queen's College, Hong Kong
Victoria Park Swimming Pool

Ireland
Victoria Cross, Cork
Victoria Mills, Cork
Victoria Lodge, Cork
Victoria Quay, Cork
Victoria Street, Cork
Victoria Avenue, Cork
Victoria Road, Cork
Victoria Street, Dublin
Victoria Quay, Dublin
Victoria Place, Galway City

Romania
Victoria, Brașov

Switzerland
Victoria Hall, concert hall in Geneva

United States
Victoria, Kansas
Victoria, Virginia, founded 1906.

Zimbabwe
Victoria Falls
(Fort) Victoria High School, Masvingo
Victoria Falls Hotel
Victoria Falls National Park

Former places

Australia

South Australia
Electoral district of Victoria

Bangladesh
 Victoria Park, Dhaka (now Bahadur Shah Park)

Cameroon
Limbe, was known as Victoria until 1982

The Gambia
Royal Victoria Teaching Hospital, Banjul (since 2013 Edward Francis Small Teaching Hospital)

Hong Kong
 Victoria City
 Tang Siu Kin Victoria Government Secondary School (Former Victoria Technical School)
 Victoria Park, Hong Kong

India
 Victoria Memorial, Alfred Park, Allahabad (now Prayagraj)

Ireland
 Queen's College, Cork, former name of University College Cork
 Queenstown former name of Cobh, County Cork

Isle of Man
 Victoria Road Prison, Douglas (demolished)

Pakistan
 Victoria Road, Karachi. (renamed Abdullah Haroon Road)
 Queen's Road, Karachi (now Moulvi Tamizuddin (M.T.) Khan Road)
 Victoria Museum (now defunct), Karachi

Sierra Leone
Victoria Park, Freetown (since mid 2017 Freetown Amusement Park)

South Africa
 Queenstown, town in Eastern Cape province (renamed Komani in 2016)

Sri Lanka
Victoria Park, Colombo (now Viharamahadevi Park)
Victoria Bridge (demolished)

United Kingdom

England
 Victoria Bridge, London, built in 1851-8, demolished in 1934 and replaced with the present Chelsea Bridge
 Victoria Road, Battersea, London (leading to the bridge mentioned above), later renamed Queen's Road and now called Queenstown Road

Scotland
Royal Victoria Hospital, Edinburgh (demolished by a fire)

Zimbabwe
Fort Victoria (now Masvingo)
Victoria Province (now Masvingo Province)
Queen Victoria Museum (now Zimbabwe Museum of Human Sciences)

See also

Queen Victoria
 Queen Victoria (disambiguation)

 Queen Victoria Street (disambiguation)
 Victoria (disambiguation)
 Victoria Avenue (disambiguation)
 Victoria Street (disambiguation)

References

Victoria (Queen) place names

Queen Victoria